The John C. Spence House is a historic house in Murfreesboro, Tennessee, U.S.. It was the fraternity house of the MTSU Pike chapter from 1974 to 1981.

History
Although the date of construction is unknown, it was moved to the current location in 1866, and it became the residence of John Cedric Spence, the owner of a grocery and hardware store, and the author of the Annals of Rutherford County. Spence lived in the house until his death in 1890. A year later, it was purchased by John A. Moore, and it remained in the Moore family until it was purchased by the Brown family in 1935.

The house was rented by the Middle Tennessee State University chapter of the Pi Kappa Alpha fraternity from 1974 to 1981.

Architectural significance
The house was designed in the Queen Anne architectural style. It has been listed on the National Register of Historic Places since August 23, 2004.

References

Houses on the National Register of Historic Places in Tennessee
Queen Anne architecture in Tennessee
Buildings and structures in Rutherford County, Tennessee
Fraternity and sorority houses
Pi Kappa Alpha